Jack & Bobby is an American drama television series created by Greg Berlanti, Vanessa Taylor, Steven A. Cohen, and Brad Meltzer. It aired on The WB from September 12, 2004, to May 11, 2005. The series’ title is a reference to real-life political brothers John and Robert Kennedy.

The series starred Matt Long and Logan Lerman as Jack and Bobby McCallister, respectively; two teenage brothers in Missouri of whom one would become the President of the United States from 2041 to 2049. The series also starred Christine Lahti as their mother, a college professor, as well as Jessica Paré, John Slattery, Edwin Hodge, Keri Lynn Pratt, and Bradley Cooper. Episodes would generally focus on the boys' family and school lives, with flash-forwards of a documentary about President McCallister used as a framing device.

While it received critical acclaim, Jack & Bobby struggled from low ratings on the network and was cancelled on May 17, 2005.

Premise 
The series follows the lives of fifteen-year-old Jack (Matt Long) and thirteen-year-old Bobby McCallister (Logan Lerman), two teen boys being raised by their strong-willed mother Grace (Christine Lahti) in a small Missouri college town. Grace is a history professor at the local university and has an unconventional approach to parenting, which includes discouraging her sons from watching TV. Elder brother Jack is popular and a star on the track team, while Bobby is nerdy and asthmatic. Each episode is interspersed with flash-forwards from a documentary about the life of President McCallister, who would take office in the 2040s. The documentary clips feature interviews with members of the McCallister administration reflecting on the president's years in office and how his formative experiences shaped his later life and how he governed. It is not revealed which of the McCallister brothers would later become president until the end of the pilot episode.

Cast and characters

Main cast
 Christine Lahti as Professor Grace McCallister
 Matt Long as Jack McCallister
 Logan Lerman as Robert "Bobby" McCallister, future President of the United States (2041-2049)
 Tim Robbins voiced the future President McCallister in the series finale
 Jessica Paré as Courtney Benedict, the future First Lady of the United States
 Brenda Wehle portrays the future Courtney McCallister in a recurring role
 Edwin Hodge as Marcus Ride, the future senior counsel of President McCallister
 Ron Canada portrays the future Marcus Ride in a recurring role
 John Slattery as Peter Benedict, the new college president and Courtney's widowed father
 Norman Lear guest starred as the future Peter Benedict
 Keri Lynn Pratt as Missy Belknap (episodes 1-20)
 Bradley Cooper as Tom Wexler Graham (episodes 4-17)

Recurring cast
 Dean Collins as Warren Feide, Bobby's best friend
 Harry Groener guest starred as an adult Warren Feide in one epsidoe
 Mike Erwin as Nate Edmonds, Courtney's former boyfriend
 Cam Gigandet as Randy Bongard, Missy's on-and-off boyfriend
 Kyle Gallner as BJ Bongaro, Bobby's "frenemy"
 Kate Mara as Katie, Jack's former girlfriend
 John Heard as Dennis Morgenthal
 Ed Begley, Jr. as Reverend Belknap, Missy's father
 Jeanette Brox as Dex Truggman, Bobby's former girlfriend

Development 
The idea for the series was conceived by novelist Brad Meltzer and Steve Cohen, the latter who served as deputy communications director in Hillary Clinton’s office during her husband's tenure as president. In 2002, Meltzer and Cohen pitched their idea to Thomas Schlamme, then an executive producer on The West Wing. The WB agreed to produce the series and Schlamme brought on Dawson’s Creek alum Greg Berlanti as well as Berlanti’s Everwood colleague Vanessa Taylor to pen the pilot episode.

Taylor said her writing on the pilot was informed by her feelings about current events, particularly the Iraq War and the failed search for weapons of mass destruction. Taylor said at the time, "I just feel that we've come into an era in which there's a certain brazenness about lying to the American public. Which, in turn, has fostered a certain degree of cynicism and apathy." The show's title is meant to "evoke the hopefulness of the Camelot era."

Berlanti said he intended to eschew the use of the words “Democrat” and “Republican” in the pilot to “avoid criticism…based on partisan politics.” He added that the show’s emphasis on the boys’ formative years “underscores how life's seemingly insignificant events can ‘have ripple effects on the future that are exponential.’”

Though the character of Grace does not steer her sons towards a particular ideology, the series creators said the show would not avoid taking stands on certain issues. Said Schlamme, "Besides the personal stories, [Jack & Bobby] allows us to talk about thematic elements that are existing in 2004 America, which is race, which is religion, which is war, and kind of get: How did these little snapshots of his life right now affect the future of the world? And then we get to see how, in fact, they could affect the future of the world."

The WB ordered 13 episodes of Jack & Bobby prior to mid-May 2004 when TV networks traditionally unveil their fall season lineups, which garnered the new series advance buzz as the first show to be picked up for the 2004 fall season. The WB acquired the show as part of a wider attempt to cultivate older audiences beyond teenagers.

Episodes

Reception

Critical reception 
The show was acclaimed by multiple critics and outlets. On review aggregator website Rotten Tomatoes, the show has a rating of 88% based on 16 critical reviews. Rob Owen of the Pittsburgh Post-Gazette wrote Jack & Bobby is "undoubtedly the most grown-up series" aired by the youth-skewing WB network and called it "an absorbing drama with hints of the idealism found in early seasons of The West Wing.'"

Alessandra Stanley of The New York Times wrote the show "could have been just another coming-of-age tale of teenagers growing up in a small town with an overbearing single mother," but its historical framing sets it apart. She wrote, "'Jack & Bobby' is unusual in many ways, and one is that unlike so many modern shows it is cynical about television but deeply romantic about politics and public service...moments of misty patriotic yearning are leavened with sharp dialogue and self-mocking asides, including some at the expense of other WB series. (On tonight's episode, Jack sarcastically tells his mother that their family is ‘straight out of '''7th Heaven’).”

Stanley praised Christine Lahti’s performance in particular, writing “Ms. Lahti is an actress who works the underlayers of each role and resists the pull of easy sentiment. Grace is a complicated, strong woman who is sympathetic without being quite likable, and that makes both her bond with Bobby (he helps her match her outfits) and her tensely hostile relationship with Jack plausible.”

Writing for Entertainment Weekly, Gillian Flynn gave the show a grade of A- and said, "On a grand scale, Jack & Bobby' reflects the American obsession with picking apart our childhoods ad nauseam for clues to the adults we become." In The New Yorker, Nancy Franklin likened the show to a mix between The Wonder Years and The West Wing, concluding it “is most emotionally effective when the lines that are drawn between Bobby’s boyhood and his adulthood meander through unexpected oxbows.”

James Poniewozik of Time found the documentary flash-forwards to be distracting, but said it’s “a smart, well-written show that constantly subverts our expectations, and it takes a rare demographic risk.”

A plot line about the parentage of Jack and Bobby received criticism from the Los Angeles Times and was described by The New Yorker as implausibly convenient.

 Awards and nominations 

 Cancelation 
Despite critical acclaim and a strong start, the show was not a successful ratings draw for the network, averaging only 2.7 million weekly viewers, and was canceled by The WB on May 17, 2005. This has been partly attributed to its airing in the same Sunday night time slot as popular primetime series Desperate Housewives. The WB changed its time slot to Wednesdays, though the ratings did not improve as it was then competing against The West Wing, The Bachelor, and American Idol.To date, physical home media for the series has not been released, but it has intermittently been made available for digital purchase on Amazon and iTunes.

 See also 
 List of fictional United States Presidents
 Diary of a Future President Notes 

References

 External links 

 
 Jack & Bobby'' official site by co-creator Brad Meltzer

2000s American political television series
2000s American teen drama television series
2004 American television series debuts
2005 American television series endings
English-language television shows
Teenage pregnancy in television
Television series about brothers
Television series about families
Television series about teenagers
Television series about bullying
Television series by Warner Bros. Television Studios
Television series created by Greg Berlanti
Television shows set in Missouri
The WB original programming
Coming-of-age television shows